1982 Japanese Super Cup was the Japanese Super Cup competition. The match was played at National Stadium in Tokyo on March 28, 1982. Fujita Industries won the championship.

Match details

References

Japanese Super Cup
1982 in Japanese football
Shonan Bellmare matches